Bharatinder Singh (born 23 October 1988) is an Indian track and field athlete from Haryana who specializes in decathlon. Bharatinder set the Indian National record of 7,658 points during the 51st National Senior Inter-State Athletics Championship held in Bangalore on 12 June 2011. He broke Jora Singh's previous mark of 7,502 points, registered in New Delhi in August 2006.

In 2014, he received the Bhim Award, the highest award for sports in Haryana.

Performance during the National record
The following table shows Bharatinder Singh's performance in the individual events when he set the Indian national record.

References

External links

Living people
1988 births
Indian male hurdlers
Indian decathletes
Athletes from Haryana
Athletes (track and field) at the 2010 Asian Games
Asian Games competitors for India